Bulgaria competed at the 2012 Summer Olympics in London, United Kingdom from 27 July to 12 August 2012. It was the nation's nineteenth appearance at the Summer Olympics, having missed the Olympics on three occasions, including the 1984 Summer Olympics in Los Angeles because of the Soviet boycott. Despite this being London's third Olympic Games, this was the first time a Bulgarian team appeared at a London Olympics. The Bulgarian Olympic Committee sent the nation's smallest delegation to the Games, tying the record with Helsinki in 1952, and with Tokyo in 1964. A total of 63 athletes, 36 men and 27 women, competed in 16 sports. Men's volleyball was the only team event in which Bulgaria was represented in these Olympic games. There was only a single competitor in badminton, sprint canoeing, fencing, and judo.

The Bulgarian team featured three Olympic medalists from Beijing in freestyle wrestling: Stanka Zlateva, who won the silver, Radoslav Velikov and Kiril Terziev, who both won the bronze. Among these medalists, only Zlateva managed to repeat her silver medal in London, losing out to Russia's Natalia Vorobieva in the final match. Two Bulgarian athletes, on the other hand, made their sixth Olympic appearance: pistol shooter, two-time gold medalist, and former Olympic record holder Maria Grozdeva, and rings gymnast and multiple-time Olympic medalist Yordan Yovchev, who was also the nation's flag bearer at the opening ceremony.

Bulgaria, however, failed to win the gold medal for the first time since 1952, after achieving poor athletic performance at these Olympic games. Only two medals were awarded to the athletes, including the bronze medal won by heavyweight boxer Tervel Pulev.

Medalists

Archery

Athletics

Bulgarian athletes have so far achieved qualifying standards in the following athletics events (up to a maximum of 3 athletes in each event at the 'A' Standard, and 1 at the 'B' Standard):

In May 2012, the Bulgarian athletics federation announced a two-year ban for Inna Eftimova after testing positive for somatotropin at the World Championships held in August 2011 in Daegu, South Korea. As a consequence of the ban she will miss the 2012 London Olympics.

Men
Field events

Women
Track & road events

Field events

Badminton

Bulgaria have won 1 quota for the women's singles competition.

Boxing

Bulgaria has so far qualified boxers for the following events

Men

Women

Canoeing

Sprint
Bulgaria has gained a quota place for the following sprint event;

Qualification Legend: FA = Qualify to final (medal); FB = Qualify to final B (non-medal)

Cycling

Road

Fencing

Bulgaria has qualified 1 fencer.

Women

Gymnastics

Artistic
Men

Women

Rhythmic

Judo

Bulgaria have won 1 quota for the men's competition

Sailing

Bulgaria has qualified 1 boat for each of the following events

Men

Women

M = Medal race; EL = Eliminated – did not advance into the medal race;

Shooting

Bulgaria has gained four quota places in the shooting events;

Men

Women

Swimming

Bulgarian swimmers have so far achieved qualifying standards in the following events (up to a maximum of 2 swimmers in each event at the Olympic Qualifying Time (OQT), and 1 at the Olympic Selection Time (OST)):

Men

Women

Tennis

Volleyball

Bulgaria's men's volleyball team have secured place in the Olympic tournament.

Men's indoor tournament

Team roster

Group play

Quarterfinal

Semifinal

Bronze medal game

Weightlifting

Bulgaria has qualified the following quota places.

Wrestling

Bulgaria has secured 9 quota places.

Men's freestyle

Men's Greco-Roman

Women's freestyle

References

External links

Nations at the 2012 Summer Olympics
2012
Summer Olympics